Pebbly Mudstone Island is a small island in the southeast part of Duroch Islands. Named by Martin Halpern, leader of the University of Wisconsin (USARP) party during geological mapping of this area, 1961–62. The principal outcrop of pebbly mudstone was found on this island and provides valuable data to the geologic history of the region.

See also 
 List of Antarctic and sub-Antarctic islands

Islands of the Duroch Islands